Kusi (previously known as Mustafabad) is a village of Kamsaar in Ghazipur District in the Indian state of Uttar Pradesh. The village has also Jama masjid Kusi. The nearest railway station is Dildar nagar. As of 2011 census the main population of the village lived in an area of 62 acres and had 796 house holds. The family of Kusi were one of the largest zamindars of Ghazipur and their zamindari was known as Kusi Kusi zamindari it became a Zamindari Chieftaincy in year 1858 which was ruled by the family of Kusi & Bhaksi, it had 15 villages with an area of 94 km² in year 1901.

Historical population

References 

Dildarnagar
Dildarnagar Fatehpur
Cities and towns in Ghazipur district
Towns and villages in Kamsar